Denzel Slager (born 2 February 1993) is a Dutch footballer who plays as a striker who last played for LA Galaxy II in the United Soccer League.

Career

RKC Waalwijk
Slager started his football career at RKC Waalwijk and signed his first professional contract with the club, keeping him until 2014. In his first season at the club Slager made five appearances for RKC Waalwijk.

In the first half of the season, Slager made nine appearances for the club, including scoring his first goal against Go Ahead Eagles on 31 August 2013.

Coventry City 
On 3 January 2014, Denzel agreed an 18-month deal which would keep him with the Sky Blues until the summer of 2015. He started his first match for the Sky Blues against Barnsley in the third round of the FA Cup on 4 January 2014, which was won 2–1.

On 18 February 2014 Slager had his contract cancelled by mutual consent.

Orange County Blues
Slager signed with third-tier US club Orange County Blues on 27 March 2015. Slager went on trial at SC Cambuur, but was unsuccessful of getting himself a contract.

LA Galaxy II
Slager joined United Soccer League side LA Galaxy II on 18 February 2016. He was released at the end of the 2016 season.

Career statistics

International 
In 2013, Denzel was part of the Curaçao under-20 side for the 2013 CONCACAF U-20 Championship

Personal 
On 10 August 2021 Slager confirmed his relation with singer Famke Louise after they appeared together on the cover of the Dutch Cosmopolitan. On January 9, 2022, Meijer gave birth to their first child, a son.

References 

1993 births
Living people
Dutch footballers
Dutch people of Curaçao descent
Association football forwards
Eredivisie players
English Football League players
USL Championship players
Coventry City F.C. players
RKC Waalwijk players
Orange County SC players
LA Galaxy II players
Footballers from Utrecht (city)